Augusto Umberto Gentile, also known as Augusto Alberto Gentile (September 11, 1891 - March 18, 1932) was a pianist and composer of Argentine tangos.  Gentile was born in Rome, Italy and signed his middle name "Alberto" because he preferred it to "Umberto".  Around 1913, he began to compose tangos.  As a performer, he recorded some tangos on piano solo for the "Telephone" label in 1918, and he was also artistic director for that label.  He worked with lyricists such as Pascual Contursi and Juan Andrés Caruso.  Gentile died in Buenos Aires, Argentina.

See also
List of public domain tangos

External links
 "Augusto Gentile", Todotango.com
 JP On The Beat
 

Argentine composers
1891 births
1932 deaths
Italian emigrants to Argentina